Claude Wilkinson (born Memphis, Tennessee) is an American poet and artist.

Life
He graduated from the University of Mississippi and University of Memphis. He was writer-in-residence at the University of Mississippi.

His work has appeared in Atlanta Review, Blue Mesa Review, California State Poetry Quarterly, Chattahoochee Review, The Oxford American, Poem, South Dakota Review, The Southern Review and Xavier Review. 
His paintings have been exhibited at University of Mississippi.

He lives in Nesbit, Mississippi.

Awards
 2000 Whiting Award
 1999 Walter E. Dakin Fellowship in Poetry from the Sewanee Writers' Conference
 1997 Naomi Long Madgett Poetry Award

Works
 
 
 Marvelous Light

Anthologies

 
 Evensong: contemporary American poets on spirituality (Bottom Dog Press, 2006) 
 Fresh Water (Pudding House Publications, 2002)

References

External links
"Claude Wilkinson", Mississippi Writers & Musicians
Profile at The Whiting Foundation

American male poets
People from Memphis, Tennessee
University of Mississippi alumni
University of Memphis alumni
Living people
People from Nesbit, Mississippi
1959 births